The 2021 William & Mary Tribe football team represented the College of William & Mary as a member of the Colonial Athletic Association (CAA) in the 2021 NCAA Division I FCS football season. The Tribe, led by third-year head coach Mike London, played their home games at Zable Stadium.

Previous season

Due to the COVID-19 pandemic, the CAA delayed the fall 2020 season and played an abbreviated schedule in the spring of 2021. The Tribe finished the season with a record of 1–2 in CAA play to finish third in the CAA's South Division.

Preseason

CAA poll
In the CAA preseason poll released on July 27, 2021, the Tribe were predicted to finish in 11th place.

Preseason All-CAA team
Punt returner Bronson Yoder was selected to the preseason All-CAA Team, while Andrew Trainer (offensive line) and Will Kiely (defensive line) were selected as preseason honorable mention picks.

Schedule

References

William and Mary
William & Mary Tribe football seasons
William and Mary Tribe football